Seyyed Mohammad Hosseini Zanjani (born 1947 in Qom) is an Iranian Twelver Shia Marja'.

Early life 
Zanjani was born in 1947. His father Mohammad Ezodin Hosseini Zanjani studied under Muhammad Hujjat Kuh-Kamari and Seyyed Hossein Borujerdi in jurisprudence and Ruhollah Khomeini and Muhammad Husayn Tabataba'i in philosophy.

Due to his revolutionary struggle against the Pahlavi regime in 1973, he was exiled until his death. His grandfather Mirza Mahmoud Hosseini Zanjani studied under Mirza Naini, aqa Zia Iraqi, Sheikh al-Isfahani, Mohammed Kazem Yazdi and Mohammad Esfahani Qa'ravi), respectively.

His family lineage is the fourth Imam Ali ibn Husayn Zayn al-Abidin, the Shia. Hosseini Zanjani has three sons and a daughter.

Education  
At an early age his father returned and he took basic seminary courses. In 1964, he went to Qom and studied under Morteza Bani Fazl and Seyed Abolfazl Mousavi Tabrizi. After leaving Qom, he studied under GH Alam al-Hoda Sayed Ibrahim.

Friday prayer 
In recent years, various proposals for the adoption of Zanjan Friday prayer were rejected, preferring regional solutions.

Migration to Mashhad 
After the death of Mohammad Ezodin Hosseini Zanjani and the mass appeal of Mashhad seminary scholars, a group of his followers migrated to the holy city of Mashhad.

Practical treatise 
Zanjan published his dissertation in 2013. As of 2016, he had published four editions. His treatise is the only source of emulation based in Mashhad.

See also 
 Mohammad Ezodin Hosseini Zanjani
 Jameh Mosque of Zanjan

References 

Iranian grand ayatollahs
Iranian Islamists
People from Zanjan, Iran
1947 births
Living people